Chay (Çay) is a rural locality (a selo) and the administrative center of Borogonsky Rural Okrug in Vilyuysky District of the Sakha Republic, Russia, located  from Vilyuysk, the administrative center of the district.  Its population as of the 2010 Census was 479; up from 478 recorded in the 2002 Census.

References

Notes

Sources
Official website of the Sakha Republic. Registry of the Administrative-Territorial Divisions of the Sakha Republic. Vilyuysky District. 

Rural localities in Vilyuysky District